View of Volterra is an oil painting on canvas by French artist Jean-Baptiste-Camille Corot, created in 1838.

Corot visited Italy for the second time in 1834, spending then a month in Volterra, a town southwest of Florence. He did at least five oil sketches of the town, during this staying. After returning to Paris, he used these cketches to create two larger paintings of Volterra. The current painting only depicts a view of the town, he directs more attention to the light and the countryside nearby. The painting is believed to be more result of his personal recollections than the depiction of a specific place.

References

External links
 

1838 paintings
Paintings by Jean-Baptiste-Camille Corot
Paintings in the collection of the Timken Museum of Art